The DWS Group (Formerly: Deutsche Asset Management) commonly referred to as DWS, is a German asset management company. It previously operated as part of Deutsche Bank until 2018 where it became a separate entity through an initial public offering on the Frankfurt Stock Exchange. It is currently headquartered in Frankfurt, Germany and is a constituent member of the SDAX index.

History 
DWS was founded in Hamburg in 1956 as "Deutsche Gesellschaft für Wertpapiersparen mbH" (German Enterprise for Securities Savings), the name was later shortened to DWS, "Die Wertpapier Spezialisten" (The Fund Specialists). Originally, the activities involved products and investment services that were initially offered to investors in Germany and throughout Europe. Activities under the DWS Investments brand were later expanded to include separate line-ups of products and investments services for investors in the USA, Asia and other regions.

Originally Deutsche Bank held 30% of DWS while the rest was held by other financial institutions. However by 2004, DWS was wholly owned by Deutsche Bank.

In 2009, DWS took control over Rosenberg Real Estate Equity Funds (RREEF) which was also owned by Deutsche Bank.

In 2012, Deutsche Bank announced the establishment of its Asset & Wealth Management (AWM) division which DWS was fully integrated into. The DWS brand name was retained as the name for the German retail business. However in 2015, AWM was split into Deutsche Asset Management and Deutsche Bank Wealth Management.

In 2017, Deutsche Asset Management was rebranded to DWS with Deutsche Bank planning to publicly list a minority stake of it.

In 2018, DWS was spun off as a separate company through an initial public offering on the Frankfurt Stock Exchange. However despite being a separate company, the majority of DWS shares are still held by Deutsche Bank at 79.49%.

In October 2018, DWS named Asoka Woehermann as the replacement for former CEO Nicolas Moreau.

A DWS annual report in 2020 claimed that half of the company's assets ran through environmental, social and corporate governance (ESG) criteria. An internal report contradicted this, and stated that only a small amount of the firm's investments applied ESG. As a result of the probe, German regulators began investigating Deutsche Bank president Karl von Rohr's role in the DWS.

In 2021, The Wall Street Journal reported that the United States Department of Justice and U.S. Securities and Exchange Commission were investigating DWS' claims of sustainable investing.

In 2022, Woehermann resigned from his post of CEO after the company’s offices in Frankfurt were raided by police. He was replaced by Stefan Hoops who was previously head of the corporate bank at Deutsche Bank.

Business overview 
DWS serves both retail and institutional clients. It has offices in Europe, Asia and the United States.

DWS has 3 main product offerings which are Active Investments, Passive Investments and Alternatives.

Actively managed mutual fund strategies include Equities, Fixed Income and Multi-Asset.

Passively managed funds include ETFs and ETCs. They are sold under the Xtrackers brand name.

Alternative investment funds include Private Equity, Real Estate and Infrastructure investments. The Real Estate funds are sold under the RREEF brand name.

Sponsorships 

DWS Investments UK sponsored English professional football club, Aston Villa F.C. from 2004 to 2006. After DWS Investments UK was bought out by Aberdeen Asset Management, DWS decided it would not renew its sponsorship contract as it had no more business links with the UK.

References

External links 

 

Deutsche Bank
Financial services companies established in 1956
Investment management companies of Germany
Companies listed on the Frankfurt Stock Exchange
German brands